The BMW 1 Series (F52) is a subcompact executive sedan developed and produced for the Chinese market, unlike the other variations of the 1 Series, which are manufactured in BMW's plants in Leipzig and Regensburg. This vehicle is manufactured by BMW Brilliance, a joint venture between BMW and Brilliance Auto.

Overview 

Unlike the BMW 1 Series hatchback of the time, it uses the front-wheel drive UKL platform. It was first shown at Auto Guangzhou in 2016, and sales started in China in February 2017. Due to its success in the Chinese market, the BMW F52 was later sold in Mexico in 2018. The M Sport version went on sale in Mexico on 21 October 2019. In other markets such as Europe, United States, and Canada, however, it is not available. Instead, the mechanically similar 2 Series Gran Coupe is offered as BMW's entry-level sedan.

References 

F52
1 Series
Cars introduced in 2016
2020s cars
Sedans
Compact cars
Front-wheel-drive vehicles